Nokdu-muk (綠豆- ; "mung bean jelly",) is a Korean muk, or jelly, made from mung bean starch. In its most commonly encountered form, it is also called cheongpo-muk (淸泡-), which literally means "clear froth jelly," owing to its clear white color. If it is colored with gardenia, the nokdu-muk is called hwangpo-muk, which literally means "yellow froth jelly."

Nokdu-muk is usually served cold, usually as the banchan (side dish) nokdu-muk-muchim (녹두묵무침). As it has little flavor of its own, nokdu-muk is typically seasoned with soy sauce and vinegar.

Nokdu-muk is a common food for special occasions.  It is often served at Korean weddings and other celebrations. Nokdumuk is also used as a main ingredient for making the Korean royal cuisine dish called tangpyeong-chae. It is made by mixing julienned nokdu-muk, stir-fried shredded beef, and various vegetables seasoned with soy sauce, vinegar, sugar, sesame seeds, salt, and sesame oil.

Hwangpo-muk or norang-muk is a Korean food which is a yellow jelly made from mung beans. The yellow color comes from dyeing with the fruit of gardenia. This jelly is particularly associated with Jeolla cuisine, and is a noted staple food of Namwon and also Jeonju (both cities in the North Jeolla province), where it is a common ingredient of Jeonju-style bibimbap.

As with other varieties of muk (Korean jelly), hwangpomuk is commonly served in small chunks seasoned with vinegar, soy sauce, and other condiments; this side dish is called hwangpomuk-muchim (황포묵무침).

See also 
 Dotori-muk – acorn jelly
 Korean cuisine
 Laping – mung bean jelly from Tibet
 Liangfen – mung bean jelly from North China
 Memil-muk – buckwheat jelly

References

External links

Mung bean jelly
Hwangpomuk photo (fourth from top)
Muk: A Refreshing Taste to Whet the Appetite

Muk (food)
Legume dishes